Cross-Strait propaganda refers to campaigns made by the Republic of China on Taiwan and the People's Republic of China on the mainland. Many of these were aimed at turning military personnel against each other's regimes and encouraging them to defect. Such activities began after the end of the Chinese Civil War and did not stop until 1990. However, some creations of this era are still in use today, such as signs facing away from their country of origin. Both sides used megaphones and radio stations for broadcasting, and balloons and floating carriers for sending leaflets and other objects. Defectors came from both sides, bringing with them information and intelligence about their original regimes.

Broadcasting stations

See also
 Propaganda in the People's Republic of China
 Propaganda in the Republic of China
 Beishan Broadcasting Wall
 Mashan Broadcasting and Observation Station

References 

Cross-Strait relations
Propaganda in China
Cold War propaganda
Propaganda in Taiwan